Malye Ivanovskiye is a rural locality (a village) in Vorobyovskoye Rural Settlement, Sokolsky District, Vologda Oblast, Russia. The population was 21 as of 2002.

Geography 
The distance to Sokol is 59 km, to Vorobyovo is 3 km. Gorka is the nearest rural locality.

References 

Rural localities in Sokolsky District, Vologda Oblast